Platylesches iva, the Evans' hopper, is a butterfly in the family Hesperiidae. It is found in Sierra Leone, Ivory Coast and Nigeria. The habitat probably consists of forests.

References

Butterflies described in 1937
Erionotini